Multi-National Forces West (MNF-W) or United States Forces West (USF-W) was one of the coalition headquarters under Multi-National Force-Iraq. It was headquartered by either I or II U.S. Marine Expeditionary Force that rotated on a 12-month basis. Their area of operations was primarily the Al Anbar province which includes the cities of Ar Ramadi, Fallujah, Al-Qa'im, and Haditha. The force was the most important U.S. unit to take part in the Iraq War in Al Anbar Governorate.

Among the smaller multinational units operating within MNF-W was a platoon from the Azerbaijani Armed Forces.

Commanders
During the Iraq War, the Marine Corps regularly rotated command of MNF-W between the 1st and 2nd Marine Expeditionary Forces.

For convenience, these changes of command are listed below and the Marine command in MNF-W is simply referred to as "MEF":

I Marine Expeditionary ForceMarch 2004 – February 2005 (James T. Conway/John F. Sattler)March 2006 – February 2007 (Richard C. Zilmer)February 2008 – February 2009 (John F. Kelly)

II Marine Expeditionary ForceMarch 2005 – February 2006 (Stephen T. Johnson)February 2007 – February 2008 (Walter Gaskin)March 2009 – January 2010 (Richard T. Tryon)

As the Marine Corps withdrew from Al Anbar Governorate, by September 2009 they were replaced by a single brigade, the 1st Brigade of the 82nd Airborne Division. The brigade was bolstered with an additional 16 advisers, though this did not reach the 48 assigned advisors that were supposed to be part of an 'Advise and Assist' brigade.

References

External links
 Official Public Website for Multi-National Forces - West

Multinational force involved in the Iraq War
Military units and formations of the United States Marine Corps
United States Marine Corps in the Iraq War
Ad hoc units and formations of the United States Marine Corps
Military units and formations established in 2004
Military units and formations disestablished in 2010